Johan Kristian Skougaard (31 July 1847 – 25 September 1925) was a Norwegian military officer and politician.

He was born in Lista, and originally took his education in the Norwegian military. He was hired as an engineer in the Norwegian Public Roads Administration in 1873, and left the military in 1887. He served as mayor of Oslo in 1905, and as director of the Norwegian Directorate of Public Roads from 1904 to 1918.

He was also a non-fiction writer, publishing the Det norske veivesens historie in two volumes, and a lexicographer, publishing a French-Norwegian dictionary in 1921. A Norwegian-French dictionary was published posthumously.

References

1847 births
1925 deaths
Norwegian Army personnel
Mayors of Oslo
Directors of government agencies of Norway
Norwegian lexicographers
Directorate of Public Roads people